Richard William Smith (born April 28, 1959) is a Canadian prelate of the Roman Catholic Church. He is the eighth and current Archbishop of Edmonton, having previously served as Bishop of Pembroke from 2002 to 2007.

Biography
Smith was born in Halifax, Nova Scotia, and there studied at St. Mary's University and the Atlantic School of Theology. He was ordained to the priesthood on May 23, 1987, and furthered his studies in Rome at the Pontifical Gregorian University, from which he earned a Licentiate (1993) and Doctorate in Sacred Theology (1998). 

Within the Archdiocese of Halifax, he served in a number of positions including vicar general and was responsible for the pastoral ministry of French-speaking Catholics in Halifax. He was also a professor of theology at St. Peter's Seminary in London in addition to serving simultaneously as pastor of three communities.

On April 27, 2002, Smith was appointed the seventh Bishop of Pembroke by Pope John Paul II. He received his episcopal consecration on the following June 18 from Archbishop Marcel Gervais, with Archbishops Terrence Prendergast, S.J., and Austin-Emile Burke serving as co-consecrators. 

He was later named the eighth Archbishop of Edmonton by Pope Benedict XVI on March 22, 2007, being formally installed on the following May 1.

In the Canadian Conference of Catholic Bishops, he has been a member of the English Sector Commission for Christian Education since 2003, and is its current Chairman. He is also the national spiritual advisor of the Catholic Women's League of Canada, and President of the Ontario Conference of Catholic Bishops.

In January 2016, Smith visited the Pallotine Province of the Assumption of the B.V.M. in Bangalore, India. Eight Pallotines of the province serve in the Archdiocese of Edmonton.

References

1959 births
Living people
People from Halifax, Nova Scotia
Saint Mary's University (Halifax) alumni
Pontifical Gregorian University alumni
Canadian Roman Catholic theologians
Roman Catholic archbishops of Edmonton
21st-century Roman Catholic archbishops in Canada
Roman Catholic bishops of Pembroke